Rancho or Ranchos may refer to:

Settlements and communities
Rancho, Aruba, former fishing village and neighbourhood of Oranjestad
Ranchos of California, 19th century land grants in Alta California
List of California Ranchos
Ranchos, Buenos Aires in Argentina

Schools
Rancho Christian School in Temecula, California
Rancho High School in North Las Vegas, Nevada
Rancho San Joaquin Middle School in Irvine, California
Rancho Solano Preparatory School in Scottsdale, Arizona
Rancho Verde High School in Moreno Valley, California

Film
Rancho, a character in the Bollywood film 3 Idiots
Rancho (monkey), an Indian monkey animal actor

Other
Rancho, a shock absorber brand by Tenneco Automotive
Rancho carnavalesto or Rancho, a type of dance club from Rio de Janeiro, Brazil
Rancho Los Amigos National Rehabilitation Center or Rancho
Rancho Point, a rock headland in the South Shetland Islands
Matra Rancho or Rancho, an early French leisure activity vehicle

See also
 
 

El Rancho (disambiguation)
Rancheria (disambiguation)
Ranchero (disambiguation)
Ranch (disambiguation)